The 1995–96 Australian Baseball League Championship was won by the Sydney Blues, who defeated the Melbourne Reds in 2 games (8-4 and 5–2) at the Sydney Showground.

Ladder

Championship series

Semi Final 1: Game 1: 1st Vs 4th at QE II Stadium

Semi Final 1: Game 2: 1st Vs 4th at QE II Stadium

Semi Final 2: Game 1: 2nd Vs 3rd at Sydney Showground

Semi Final 2: Game 2: 2nd Vs 3rd at Sydney Showground

Final Series: Game 1: Winner Semi Final 1 Vs Winner Semi Final 2 at Sydney Showground

Final Series: Game 2: Winner Semi Final 1 Vs Winner Semi Final 2 at Sydney Showground

Awards

Top Stats

All-Star Team

References

Australian Baseball League (1989–1999) seasons
1995 in Australian baseball
1996 in Australian baseball